Gomphrena is a genus of plants in the family Amaranthaceae. They are known as the globe amaranths.

Species include:
 Gomphrena agrestis
 Gomphrena canescens
 Gomphrena celosioides
 Gomphrena globosa—Globe amaranth
 Gomphrena haageana—Strawberry globe amaranth
 Gomphrena perennis
 Gomphrena pohlii
 Gomphrena prostrata
 Gomphrena pulchella
 Gomphrena serrata
 Gomphrena sonorae

Gallery

References

External links
 

 
Amaranthaceae genera